Podismopsis is a genus of grasshoppers in the subfamily Gomphocerinae and tribe Chrysochraontini, erected by Zubovski in 1900.  Species have been recorded from central Europe through to temperate east Asia, including Japan.

Species 
The Orthoptera Species File lists:
 Podismopsis altaica (Zubovski, 1900) - type species(as Chrysochraon altaica Zubovski)
 Podismopsis amplimedius Zheng & Shi, 2010
 Podismopsis amplipennis Zheng & Lian, 1988
 Podismopsis ampliradiareas Zheng, Cao & Lian, 1991
 Podismopsis angustipennis Zheng & Lian, 1988
 Podismopsis aquamopennis Wang, 2007
 Podismopsis bisonita Zheng, Cao & Lian, 1991
 Podismopsis brachycaudata Zhang & Jin, 1985
 Podismopsis dailingensis Zheng & Shi, 2010
 Podismopsis dolichocerca Ren, Zhang & Zheng, 1994
 Podismopsis frontalis Mistshenko, 1951
 Podismopsis gelida Miram, 1931
 Podismopsis genicularibus (Shiraki, 1910)
 Podismopsis gynaemorpha Ikonnikov, 1911
 Podismopsis humengensis Zheng & Lian, 1988
 Podismopsis insularis Mistshenko, 1951
 Podismopsis jacuta Miram, 1928
 Podismopsis jinbensis Zheng, Cao & Lian, 1991
 Podismopsis juxtapennis Zheng & Lian, 1988
 Podismopsis keisti (Nadig, 1989)
 Podismopsis konakovi Bey-Bienko, 1948
 Podismopsis mongolica Bey-Bienko, 1959
 Podismopsis mudanjiangensis Ren, Zhang & Zheng, 1994
 Podismopsis planicaudata Liang & Jia, 1994
 Podismopsis poppiusi (Miram, 1907) (two subspecies)
 Podismopsis quadrasonita Zhang & Jin, 1985
 Podismopsis relicta Ramme, 1931
 Podismopsis rufipes Ren, Zhang & Zheng, 1991
 Podismopsis shareiensis Shiraki, 1930
 Podismopsis silvestris Storozhenko, 1986
 Podismopsis sinucarinata Zheng & Lian, 1988
 Podismopsis squamopennis Lu, Wang & Ren, 2011
 Podismopsis styriaca Koschuh, 2008
 Podismopsis transsylvanica Ramme, 1951
 Podismopsis tumenlingensis Zhang & Ren, 1992
 Podismopsis tuqiangensis Zheng & Shi, 2010
 Podismopsis ussuriensis Ikonnikov, 1911 (two subspecies)
 Podismopsis viridis Ren, Zhang & Zheng, 1994
 Podismopsis yurii Storozhenko, 2006

References

External links

Orthoptera genera
Orthoptera of Asia
Orthoptera of Europe
Gomphocerinae